Aegerter is a surname that can be traced to the canton of Bern, Switzerland. People with this surname include:

 Daniel Aegerter, Swiss investor and entrepreneur
 Dominique Aegerter (born 1990), Swiss motorcycle racer
 Karl Aegerter (1888–1969), Swiss artist
 Mia Aegerter (born 1976), Swiss singer and actor
 Silvan Aegerter (born 1980), Swiss footballer

References 

Swiss-German surnames